A cryptodepression is a depression in the Earth's surface that is below mean sea level, and which is filled by a lake. The term is derived from the Ancient Greek word  ('hidden') and depression.

Description 
A  cryptodepression is often due to creation of a rift valley or a glacial lake.

Lakes are often long and narrow. Further, the surrounding landscape and the shore of the lake can be very steep.

Examples 

 Simple calculation example:
 Lago O'Higgins/San Martín
 Surface elevation  250 m -
 Maximal depth      836 m =
 _
 Cryptodepression  -586 m

 Glacial lakes and moraine-dammed lakes: major prealpine lakes in Italy have cryptodepressions created by erosion. In other parts of the Alps, Swiss, Bavarian and Austrian lakes, cryptodepressions are not found because the lakes have significantly higher elevations. Glacial lakes creating cryptodepressions also occur in Norway, Chile, Argentina, Newfoundland, New Zealand, and Scotland. In North America, four of the five Great Lakes (all except Erie) and two of the Finger Lakes in New York, Cayuga Lake and Seneca Lake, are examples of cryptodepressions. Mälaren in Sweden was created by a different process; it had been an arm of the Baltic Sea as recently as the Viking Age before being cut off from the sea by post-glacial rebound.
 Rift valleys: the deepest known cryptodepression on Earth is in Lake Baikal (-1200 m). Other notable examples include Lake Tanganyika and Lake Malawi in Africa's East African Rift.

References

Depressions (geology)

de:Depression (Geologie)